Postal codes in Hungary are four digit numeric. The first digit is for the postal region, as listed below (with the postal centre indicated after the number):
 1xxx Budapest (*)
 2xxx Szentendre
 3xxx Hatvan
 4xxx Debrecen (*)
 5xxx Szolnok
 6xxx Kecskemét
 7xxx Sárbogárd
 8xxx Székesfehérvár
 9xxx Győr

Not all of the above are county capitals: Hatvan, Sárbogárd and Szentendre are major cities, but not county capitals. They are, however, all well communicated cities and big junctions.

In Budapest postal codes are in the format 1XYZ, where X and Y are the two digits of the district number (from 01 to 23) and the last digit is the identification number of the post office in the district (there are more than one in each district). A special system exists for PO Box deliveries, which do not follow the district system. These special postal codes refer to a specific post office rather than an area. The "1000" postal code designates the Countrywide Logistics Centre, which is currently located outside the 1000 region, in Budaörs, which is in the 2000 region.

The rest of the country is structured as follows:
 County capitals are always designated a postcode ending with "00". However, some cities have postal codes ending on "00" without being a county capital.
 Cities generally have postcodes ending with "0".
 Smaller towns and villages have any other number.

Bigger cities were formerly divided into districts, which often lives on in postcodes. This can be confusing, as 3000 designates Hatvan, but 3001 does not designate District 1, but it is actually a PO Box postal code.

Customers can search the Hungarian Postal Service website for postal codes or download the entire list in .xls.

See also
 List of postal codes in Hungary
 ISO 3166-2:HU
 Counties of Hungary

Communications in Hungary
Hungary
Postal system of Hungary